A special election was held in  on October 13, 1829 to fill two vacancies in Pennsylvania's congressional delegation before the first session of the 21st Congress.  The vacancies had been caused by the resignations of Samuel D. Ingham (J) who was chosen as U.S. Treasury Secretary and George Wolf (J) who was elected Governor of Pennsylvania

Election results
As the 8th district was a plural district with two seats, both empty, this election sent two people to Congress, bolded here for clarity.

Ihrie and Smith took their seats on December 7, 1829, the first day of the First Session of the 21st Congress

See also
List of special elections to the United States House of Representatives

References

Pennsylvania 1829 08
Pennsylvania 1829 08
1829 08
Pennsylvania 08
United States House of Representatives 08
United States House of Representatives 1829 08